Halldór Guðbjörnsson (born 21 September 1946) is an Icelandic judoka. He competed in the men's lightweight event at the 1980 Summer Olympics.

References

1946 births
Living people
Halldór Gudbjörnsson
Halldór Gudbjörnsson
Judoka at the 1980 Summer Olympics
Place of birth missing (living people)